In baseball, a captain is an honorary title sometimes given to a member of the team to acknowledge his leadership. In the early days of baseball, a captain was a player who was responsible for many of the functions now assumed by managers and coaches, such as preparing lineups, making decisions about strategy, and encouraging teamwork. In amateur or youth baseball, a manager or coach may appoint a team captain to assist in communicating with the players and to encourage teamwork and improvement.

The official rules of Major League Baseball (MLB) only briefly mention the position of team captain. Official Baseball Rule 4.03 Comment (formerly Rule 4.01 Comment), which discusses the submission of a team's lineup card to the umpire, notes that obvious errors in the lineup should be brought to the attention of the team's manager or captain.

Only a few major league teams have had captains in recent years, two examples being Adrián Beltré of the Texas Rangers and David Wright of the New York Mets, both of whom served in the role from 2013 through 2018. As of the  season, the New York Yankees are the only team with a captain; Aaron Judge was given the honor on December 21, 2022. Jerry Remy, who was named as captain of the California Angels in 1977 at age 24, explains that in today's modern age of baseball, "there's probably no need for a captain on a major league team.  I think there are guys who lead by example.  You could name the best player on your team as captain, but he may not be the guy other players will talk to or who will quietly go to other players and give them a prod."

Baseball captains generally do not wear an NHL-style "C" on their jersey. Mike Sweeney, captain of the Kansas City Royals from 2003 to 2007, wore the "C" patch, as did John Franco and Keith Hernandez of the Mets, and Jason Varitek of the Boston Red Sox. Brandon Belt of the San Francisco Giants wore an unofficial "C" patch (made from electrical tape) in a game on September 10, 2021, as a joke.

History

In the 19th and early 20th century, the captain held most of the on-field responsibilities that are held by managers and coaches in modern baseball. For example, according to the 1898 official rules, the captain was responsible for assigning the players' positions and batting order, for appealing to the umpire if he observed certain violations (for example, if the other team intentionally discolored the ball or its players illegally left the bench), and for informing the umpire of any special ground rules. During a period when teams didn't carry full-time coaches, the captain and one or more other players could serve as "coachers" of the base runners; the lines setting off the section where they were allowed to stand were designated as "captain's lines." If the umpire made a decision that could "be plainly shown by the code of rules to have been illegal", the "captain alone shall be allowed to make the appeal for reversal." The rules stated that the captain must be one of the nine players, implying that a non-playing manager would not have been allowed to act in the captain's role. In contrast with modern baseball, the 1898 rules did not mention the managers having any rights to interact with the umpires. The rules allowed managers to sit on the team's bench during the game, but were otherwise silent with respect to rights and responsibilities of managers.

In early baseball, many teams had playing managers who had both the off-field responsibilities of managers and the on-field responsibilities of captains. They held the title of "manager-captain." In contrast, teams that had non-playing managers hired a player to serve as captain. For example, in early 1902, Jack Doyle was signed as captain and first baseman of the New York Giants while non-player Horace Fogel was manager.

The role of captain has been significant in the histories of some teams, such as the Yankees, Red Sox, and Giants. Conversely, some teams have never named a captain, such as the Milwaukee Brewers.

Lists of major league team captains

 List of Atlanta Braves captains
 List of Baltimore Orioles captains
 List of Boston Red Sox captains
 List of Chicago Cubs captains
 List of Chicago White Sox captains
 List of Cincinnati Reds captains
 List of Cleveland Guardians captains
 List of Detroit Tigers captains
 List of Houston Astros captains
 List of Kansas City Royals captains
 List of Los Angeles Angels captains
 List of Los Angeles Dodgers captains
 List of Minnesota Twins captains
 List of New York Mets captains
 List of New York Yankees captains
 List of Oakland Athletics captains
 List of Philadelphia Phillies captains
 List of Pittsburgh Pirates captains
 List of San Diego Padres captains
 List of San Francisco Giants captains
 List of Seattle Mariners captains
 List of St. Louis Cardinals captains
 List of Texas Rangers captains

Notes

Baseball terminology
Baseball
Major League Baseball
Leadership positions in sports